Kalla may refer to:

Places
 Kalla, village and a mandal in West Godavari district in the state of Andhra Pradesh in India
 Kalla, Asansol, neighbourhood in Asansol, West Bengal, India
 Kalla, Iran, a village in East Azerbaijan Province, Iran
 Kalla, Burkina Faso, a village in Bagaré, Passoré province, Burkina Faso
 Lake Kalla (Minnesota)
 Lake Kalla (Finland), aka. Kallavesi

Other
 KALLA or Karlsruhe Liquid-metal Laboratory
 Kalla (name)

See also

Calla (disambiguation)
Kallas
Kallu (name)